Osborne is an unincorporated community in south central Manitoba, Canada. It is located on Provincial Road 330 approximately 41 kilometers (26 miles) south of Winnipeg, Manitoba  in the Rural Municipality of Macdonald.

References 

Unincorporated communities in Manitoba